Her Big Adventure is a 1926 American silent comedy drama film directed by John Ince and starring Herbert Rawlinson, Grace Darmond, and Vola Vale.

Plot
As described in a film magazine review, Ralph Merriwell quarrels with his wealthy father, and decides to set out on his own, taking a bell hop job at a Los Angeles job. Betty Burton, who works for Ralph's father as a stenographer, wins a $1000 prize for an ad and goes to the hotel. She poses as Countess Fontaine and Ralph falls in love with her. Complications then ensue when the real Count and Countess Fontaine arrive at the hotel, as do some jewel thieves. By the end, Ralph is reconciled with his father and wins the affection of Betty.

Cast

References

Bibliography
 Munden, Kenneth White. The American Film Institute Catalog of Motion Pictures Produced in the United States, Part 1. University of California Press, 1997.

External links

1926 films
1926 drama films
Silent American drama films
Films directed by John Ince
American silent feature films
1920s English-language films
American black-and-white films
1920s American films